Bosilkovo is a village in Sungurlare Municipality, in Burgas Province, in southeastern Bulgaria. Most inhabitants are Pomaks.

References

Villages in Burgas Province